Engin Yadigar (born 12 June 1944) is a Turkish boxer. He competed in the men's flyweight event at the 1968 Summer Olympics.

References

1944 births
Living people
Turkish male boxers
Olympic boxers of Turkey
Boxers at the 1968 Summer Olympics
Sportspeople from Istanbul
Mediterranean Games bronze medalists for Turkey
Mediterranean Games medalists in boxing
Competitors at the 1967 Mediterranean Games
Flyweight boxers
20th-century Turkish people